Berri Regional Secondary is a public high school in the Riverland of South Australia. The school was formed in 1941. There is one campus in Berri servicing Year 7 through 12.

The school was redeveloped in 1974.  A new senior campus of the school was completed in 2008.

References

Educational institutions established in 1941
High schools in South Australia
1941 establishments in Australia